Facundo Nahuel Milán Osorio (born 3 February 2001) is a Uruguayan footballer who plays as forward for Montevideo Wanderers.

References

2001 births
Living people
Uruguayan footballers
Uruguayan expatriate footballers
Association football forwards
Uruguayan Primera División players
Defensor Sporting players
São Paulo FC players
Montevideo Wanderers F.C. players
Uruguayan expatriate sportspeople in Brazil
Expatriate footballers in Brazil